This list is for railway lines across Great Britain and Northern Ireland, which are now abandoned, closed, dismantled or disused. Within the United Kingdom, examples exist of opened railways which formerly constituted cross-country main trunk lines as well as many more which served more local, or exclusively industrial, needs.

Some of the included lines have re-opened, in part or in full, following a period of closure. Such reopenings have taken the form of independent preserved heritage railways, and of expansions to state-backed National Rail and local rapid transit/light rail networks. Many more of these lines have converted to cycleways, footpaths or highways.

England

Northern Ireland

Scotland
See also Template:Historical Scottish railway companies

Wales

See also
 List of railway lines in Great Britain for extant lines.
 List of British heritage and private railways
 List of closed railway stations in Britain
 History of rail transport in Great Britain
 Beeching cuts

References

 
Closed railway lines in Great Britain
Bri